The Etruscan Mask is a supernatural horror movie written and directed by Ted Nicolaou. Shot in Italy in 2006, the film was released in 2007.

Plot

In the unique city of Siena, Italy, five foreign university students stumble across an ancient Etruscan mask. After a series of unexplainable events, it becomes clear that the mask must be destroyed. However, one of the students has already succumbed to its powers and in doing so has released an ancient demon which has no intention of being destroyed.

Cast
 Majlinda Agaj	...	Jude
 Ulla Alasjarvi	...	Minerva
 Maylis Iturbide	...	Aurora
 Cristopher Jones	...	Father Cristopher
 Alex Nicolaou	...	Stanton
 Piero Ali Passatore	...	Mark (as Piero Passatore)
 Andrea Redavid	...	Speed

Production

The film was shot in Siena and Turin.

Reception

The movie won the Best Film Prize at the 2007 edition of the International Horror And Fantasy Film Festival in Estepona.

External links
  Official Website
 The Etruscan Mask at the Internet Movie Database

2007 horror films
Italian supernatural horror films
2007 films
2000s Italian-language films
English-language Italian films
Films directed by Ted Nicolaou
Films shot in Italy